Aleksandar Petrović (born 1 February 1985), also referred as Aleksandar R. Petrović, is a Serbian former footballer.

He was part of the FR Yugoslavia U17 team at the 2002 UEFA European Under-17 Championship.

Achievements
FK Vardar
Macedonian First Football League: 1
Winner: 2012–13

External sources
 Profile and stats at Srbijafudbal
 Aleksandar Petrović Stats at Utakmica.rs

Living people
1985 births
People from Pirot
Serbian footballers
FK Bežanija players
OFK Mladenovac players
FK Hajduk Beograd players
FK Hajduk Kula players
FC Shinnik Yaroslavl players
Russian Premier League players
Expatriate footballers in Russia
FK Rad players
Serbian First League players
Serbian SuperLiga players
FK Radnički Obrenovac players
FK Metalac Gornji Milanovac players
FK BSK Borča players
FK Voždovac players
FK Kolubara players
OFK Beograd players
Association football midfielders
Macedonian First Football League players
FK Vardar players
Serbian expatriate footballers